Fernando González is a professional tennis player from Chile.

Fernando González may also refer to:

Sports
 Fernando González (athlete), Paralympic athlete from Cuba
 Fernando González (baseball) (born 1950), Major League Baseball player from Puerto Rico
 Fernando Gonzalez (fighter) (born 1983), American mixed martial artist
 Fernando González (footballer, born 1988), Argentine left-back
 Fernando González (footballer, born 1989), Puerto Rican midfielder
 Fernando González (footballer, born 1994), Mexican defensive midfielder
 Fernando González (footballer, born 1997), Mexican midfielder
 Fernando González (footballer, born 2001), Mexican midfielder
 Fernando González (judoka) (born 1969), judoka from Spain
 Fernando González (swimmer) (born 1950), Ecuadorian swimmer
 Fernando González (volleyball) (born 1989), Venezuelan volleyball player
 Nando González (1921–1988), Spanish former footballer
 Mariano Fernando González (born 1980), Argentine football defender

Other fields
 Fernán González of Castile (died 970), count
 Fernando González, one of the Cuban Five
 Fernando González (writer) (1895–1964), Colombian philosopher
 Fernando González de Bariodero (died 1556), bishop of Nicaragua
 Fernando González Casellas (1925–1998), Argentine composer of classical music
 Fernando González de la Cuesta (died 1561), Catholic prelate
 Fernando González de Marañón (died 1219), grand master of the Order of Santiago
 Fernando González de Traba (fl. 1159–1165), medieval Spanish nobleman
 Fernando González Fernández (died 1419), Spanish Franciscan and diplomat
 Fernando González Gortázar (born 1942), Mexican architect
 Fernando González Laxe (born 1952), Spanish politician
 Fernando González Pacheco (1932–2014), Spanish-Colombian journalist
 Fernando González Roa (1880–1936), Mexican diplomat